Events from the year 1551 in Sweden

Incumbents
 Monarch – Gustav I

Events

 - Georg Norman is appointed ambassador.

Births

Deaths

 26 August - Margaret Leijonhufvud, queen  (born 1516)

References

 
Years of the 16th century in Sweden
Sweden